Irving Park station could refer to:
 Irving Park station (Metra), a commuter rail station in the Irving Park neighborhood of Chicago, Illinois, United States
 Irving Park station (CTA Blue Line), a rapid transit station adjacent to the commuter rail station
 Irving Park station (CTA Brown Line), a rapid transit station three miles east of the other two stations